Holzapfel Knows Everything is a 1932 German comedy film directed by Victor Janson and starring Felix Bressart, Iván Petrovich and Gretl Theimer. It was shot at the Grunewald Studios in Berlin. The film's sets were designed by the art director Jacek Rotmil.

Main cast
 Felix Bressart as Johannes Georg Holzapfel
 Iván Petrovich as Stephan Berregi
 Gretl Theimer as Eva Stein
 Theodor Loos as Konsul van Doeren
 Dieterle Henkels as Teddy Stein, ein Junge
 Anton Pointner as Oskar
 Julius Falkenstein as Jule
 John Mylong as Fritz
 Paul Morgan as Emil
 Robert Näestelberger as Jakob
 Josef Bunzl as Heinrich
 Nico Turoff as Hans
 Henry Bender as Otto, Kneipenwirt
 Gertrud de Lalsky as Frau von Bloemen
 Eugen Burg as Polizeikommissar

References

Bibliography 
 Bock, Hans-Michael & Bergfelder, Tim. The Concise Cinegraph: Encyclopaedia of German Cinema. Berghahn Books, 2009.

External links 
 

1932 comedy films
German comedy films
1932 films
Films of the Weimar Republic
1930s German-language films
Films directed by Victor Janson
German black-and-white films
Films scored by Hans J. Salter
1930s German films